Ralph Edwards (1913–2005) was an American radio and television host

Ralph Edwards may also refer to:
Ralph Edwards (baseball) (1882–1949), American baseball infielder
Ralph Edwards (conservationist) (c. 1892–1977), British Columbia homesteader and conservationist
Ralph Edwards (footballer) (born 1935), Australian footballer for Footscray
Ralph Edwards (Royal Navy officer) (1901–1963), British admiral
Ralph Edwards (politician), politician in Maine